Eva Celia Lesmana or better known as Eva Celia (born in Jakarta, Indonesia on September 21, 1992) is an Indonesian actress and singer-songwriter of mixed Dutch, German-Jewish, Bugis, Javanese, Minangkabau and Madurese descent. She is the daughter of Indonesian jazz musician, Indra Lesmana.

Acting 
Celia performed in several television soap operas. She performed in Sherina as Sherina, played the role of Juwita in Juwita Jadi Putri, and as Siska in Sentuh Hatiku.

She made her film acting debut in 2008, in the horror film Takut: Faces of Fear. She went on to perform in Jamila and the President (2009) as the young Jamila, Adriana (2013) as Adriana, and The Golden Cane Warrior (2014).

In 2015, she produced a short film called Biang.

Celia has also appeared in advertisements for GIV, Tolak Angin Anak, RexonaTeen, Suzuki Karimun Estilo, Emeron, and the Samsung Galaxy A8.

Music 
Celia is a jazz singer-songwriter, guitarist, and lyricist. As the daughter of a well-known musician, she says that she was influenced by the music she heard at home growing up, even though she was never pressured by her father to pursue music.

She released her first singles, "Reason" and "Against Time," in 2015. She followed up the next year with her first album, And So It Begins. Performers on the album included her father, Aldhan Prasatya, Demas Narawangsa, Tendra, members of Snarky Puppy and Beau Diakowicz.

In 2016, she was nominated for "Penyanyi Solo Pria/Wanita Soul/R&B/Urban Terbaik" in the Indonesian Music Awards.

In 2017, she received nominations for both Album of the Year and Female Singer of the Year at the Indonesian Choice Awards.

Her early public performances included Java Jazz 2013, where she performed with her father, Indra Lesmana. In 2017, she performed as part of "3 Stories, 1 Room," a tour of six Indonesian cities with musicians Kunto Aji and Jordi Waelauruw.

References 

Indonesian film actresses
Indonesian television actresses
21st-century Indonesian actresses
Actresses from Jakarta
Singers from Jakarta
21st-century Indonesian women singers
Indonesian people of Dutch descent
Indonesian people of German descent
Indonesian people of German-Jewish descent
Indonesian Christians
Indo people
Bugis people
Javanese people
Minangkabau people
Madurese people
1992 births
Living people